The Hamburg Ladies & Gents Cup is a professional tennis tournament played on indoor hard courts. It is currently part of the ATP Challenger Tour and the ITF Women's World Tennis Tour. It is held annually in Hamburg, Germany since 2019.

Past finals

Men's singles

Women's singles

Men's doubles

Women's doubles

References

ATP Challenger Tour
ITF Women's World Tennis Tour
Hard court tennis tournaments
Tennis tournaments in Germany
2019 establishments in Germany
Sports competitions in Hamburg
Recurring sporting events established in 2019